German submarine U-94 was a Type VIIC U-boat of Nazi Germany's Kriegsmarine during World War II. She was laid down on 9 September 1939 at the F. Krupp Germaniawerft in Kiel as yard number 599, launched on 12 June 1940 and commissioned on 10 August 1940 under Kapitänleutnant Herbert Kuppisch.

Design
German Type VIIC submarines were preceded by the shorter Type VIIB submarines. U-94 had a displacement of  when at the surface and  while submerged. She had two shafts and two  propellers.

U-94 was fitted with five  torpedo tubes (four fitted at the bow and one at the stern), fourteen torpedoes, one  SK C/35 naval gun, 220 rounds, and a  C/30 anti-aircraft gun. The boat had a complement of between forty-four and sixty.

Service history

First patrol
The boat left Kiel on 20 November 1940, heading for Lorient in France which she reached, via the North Sea on 31 December.

 
She also sent Wilhelmina and Empire Statesman to the bottom on the second and the 11th respectively.

After that, the boat headed for mid-ocean before docking at her French Atlantic base.

Second and third patrols
U-94 returned to the Atlantic west of Ireland and Scotland for her second patrol. She sank three more ships:  on 20 January 1941, West Wales on the 29th and Rushpool on the 30th.

For her third sortie, the boat moved into the waters west of Iceland. She sank Harbledown on 4 April 1941 and Lincoln Ellsworth on the sixth. The latter ship was destroyed by a combination of torpedo and fire from the deck gun.

Fourth and fifth patrols
U-94 was attacked by the escorts of convoy OB 318 on 7 May 1941. Some 98 depth charges over four hours were dropped. The boat persisted with her attack, however, sinking Eastern Star and Ixion.

Two more merchantmen met their end on the 20th: Norman Monarch and John P. Pedersen.

Patrol number five was carried out west of the Canary Islands; it was relatively uneventful.

Sixth patrol
Having left St. Nazaire on 2 September 1941, U-94 operated southeast of Cape Farewell (Greenland). She sank Newbury, Pegasus and Empire Eland, all on the 15th. On 1 October, she fired five torpedoes at San Florentino. Three of them struck home; the ship broke in two after the third impact.

The boat returned to Kiel on 15 October.

Seventh patrol
U-94 departed Kiel on 12 January 1942; she negotiated the gap between the Faroe and Shetland Islands, docking once more at St. Nazaire on the 30th.

Eighth patrol
The U-boat continued her successes on the western side of the Atlantic. She sank the Empire Hail east of St. Johns, Newfoundland on 24 February 1942. She also sank Hvoslef two miles east of Fenwick Island, off Delaware Bay on the 11th.

Ninth patrol
U-94 left St. Nazaire on 4 May 1942 for what would be her top-scoring patrol, (it was to be carried out once more south of Greenland). Moving into this area, a steady stream of sinkings resulted; the Cocle on 12 May, Batna and Tolken, both on the 13th - a sailing ship, Maria da Glória on 5 June; Ramsay and Empire Clough on the tenth. Her last kill was Pontypridd, on the following day.

Tenth patrol and loss
The boat left St. Nazaire for the last time for the Caribbean on 3 August 1942. Off Haiti on the 28th, she was sunk by depth charges dropped by a US PBY Catalina from VP-92 and ramming by the Canadian corvette .

Nineteen men died with the U-boat; there were twenty-six survivors.

Wolfpacks
U-94 took part in six wolfpacks, namely:
 West (8 – 29 May 1941) 
 Süd (22 July – 5 August 1941) 
 Seewolf (5 – 15 September 1941) 
 Brandenburg (15 – 29 September 1941) 
 Robbe (17 – 24 January 1942) 
 Hecht (8 May – 16 June 1942)

Summary of raiding history

References

Notes

Bibliography

External links

World War II submarines of Germany
U-boats sunk in 1942
U-boats sunk by US aircraft
U-boats sunk by Canadian warships
World War II shipwrecks in the Caribbean Sea
1940 ships
Ships built in Kiel
German Type VIIC submarines
U-boats commissioned in 1940
Maritime incidents in August 1942